Francis Popham may refer to:
Sir Francis Popham (1573–1644), English soldier and colonizer
Sir Francis Popham (1646–1674), English MP for Bath, grandson of the above
Francis Popham (died 1734), English MP for Wootton Basset and Chippenham
Francis Popham (cricketer) (1809–1880), Oxford University cricketer